Nyara Sabally (born 26 February 2000) is a German professional basketball player for the New York Liberty of the Women's National Basketball Association (WNBA) and assistant coach for Sacramento State. She played college basketball at Oregon. She represented Germany at the 2018 FIBA U18 Women's European Championship and won a gold medal.

Playing career

College
On 7 November 2017, Sabally signed with Oregon. During the 2018–19 season in her freshman year, she sat out the season after suffering a torn ACL during the championship game of the 2018 FIBA U18 Women's European Championship in August of 2018. During the 2019–20 season in her redshirt freshman year, she re-tore her ACL in the summer of 2019 and missed a second consecutive season.

During the 2020–21 season in her redshirt sophomore year, she played in 23 of Oregon's 24 games, making 21 starts. She led Oregon in scoring (12.9), rebounding (7.3), field goals (122), double-doubles (4) and double-figure scoring games (19). She ranked third in the Pac-12 in field-goal percentage (54.7), third in offensive rebounding (2.7), fourth in rebounding and tenth in scoring. Following the season she was named to the All-Pac-12 team. 

During the 2021–22 season in her redshirt junior year, she led the team in scoring and rebounding and finished sixth in the conference in scoring (15.4) and third in rebounding (7.8). She recorded eight double-doubles, and reached double figures in scoring in 19 of the 24 games. She became the first Pac-12 player since Chiney Ogwumike in 2013 to average at least 15 points, seven rebounds, 1.5 assists and 1.3 steals and blocks over the course of a season. Following the season she was again named to the All-Pac-12 team.

On 28 March 2022, Sabally declared for the 2022 WNBA Draft. She finished her career at Oregon with 666 points, 354 rebounds and 87 assists in two seasons.

WNBA
On 11 April 2022, Sabally was drafted fifth overall by the New York Liberty in the 2022 WNBA Draft. On 15 April 2022, Liberty general manager Jonathan Kolb announced Sabally would miss the 2022 WNBA season due to injury, after she aggravated her right knee, which has twice required surgery for a torn ACL.

On 28 February 2023, Sabally signed a rookie scale contract with the Liberty.

National team career
Sabally made her international debut for Germany at the 2015 FIBA Europe Under-16 Championship for Women, where she averaged nine points, 13.2 rebounds and 1.8 assists per game. She represented Germany at the 2018 FIBA U18 Women's European Championship, where she averaged 17.3 points, 12.8 rebounds and 1.8 assists per game, and won a gold medal, and was named tournament MVP.

Coaching career
On 12 July 2022, Sabally was named an assistant coach for Sacramento State.

Personal life
Nyara's older sister Satou, who played for Oregon in both seasons that Nyara missed due to injury, is a professional basketball player for the Dallas Wings of the WNBA.

References

2000 births
Living people
German people of Gambian descent
German sportspeople of African descent
German women's basketball players
Forwards (basketball)
German expatriate basketball people in the United States
Sportspeople from Berlin
Oregon Ducks women's basketball players
New York Liberty draft picks